Outer Lee Island is a small island 1.5 nautical miles (2.8 km) north-northwest of Bellingshausen Point, lying in the outer part of the Bay of Isles, South Georgia. This island was charted in 1912-13 by Robert Cushman Murphy, American naturalist aboard the brig Daisy, who included it as one of two islands which he called the Lee Islands. These islands were recharted in 1929-30 by DI personnel, who renamed this northeastern of the two, Outer Lee Island. The southwestern island is now known as Inner Lee Island.

See also 
 List of Antarctic and sub-Antarctic islands

Islands of South Georgia